Revius Oliver Ortique Jr. (June 14, 1924 – June 22, 2008) was an American jurist, the first African-American justice of the Louisiana Supreme Court, and civil rights activist.

Born in New Orleans, Louisiana, he served as an officer in the United States Army during World War II, and later graduated from Dillard University. He was a judge of the Orleans Parish Civil District Court from 1978 to 1992, serving as Chief Judge of that district from 1986 onward. In 1992, Revius Ortique was the first African-American elected to the Louisiana Supreme Court. He died in Baton Rouge, Louisiana.

See also
List of African-American jurists

Notes

1924 births
2008 deaths
African-American judges
Politicians from New Orleans
Dillard University alumni
Justices of the Louisiana Supreme Court
Lawyers from New Orleans
Military personnel from Louisiana
20th-century American judges
20th-century American lawyers
20th-century African-American people
21st-century African-American people